Autonomous Socialist Party may refer to:

Autonomous Socialist Party (France)
Autonomous Socialist Party (Jura)
Autonomous Socialist Party (Ticino)